Jody Dean (born 1959) is an American journalist and author and a member of the Texas Radio Hall of Fame. During his career, Dean has worked with, interviewed, or performed with thousands of public figures, actors, musicians, authors, artists, and comics. Dean currently hosts a program on CBS-11 in DFW.

Early life and education
Born in Fort Worth, Texas, Dean's career in broadcasting began in junior high school in 1973 on WBAP-TV's Museum of Horrors. After graduating from Ft. Worth's Paschal High School as a highly recruited football player, he took a shift at Abilene Christian University's campus radio station. Dean eventually left college for his first job, at KPAR in Granbury, Texas. A few months later he was hired at 1360 KXOL and has worked in Dallas-Ft. Worth ever since.

Career

1980-1987
In 1980, Dean moved to 1190 KLIF. In 1981, he took on a three-hour Tuesday overnight shift at Dallas' legendary KVIL. Dean was eventually promoted to evenings, but his ratings were disastrous. In 1987, he was taken off the air and moved to a behind-the-scenes job as morning show producer, a move that resulted in seven years of tutelage under the direct oversight of National Broadcast Association Hall of Famer Ron Chapman, who remains Dean's close friend and mentor.

1991-1999
In 1991, Dean became executive producer for the Dallas Cowboys Radio Network. In 1994, he moved to KRLD to host a mid-day talk show. Again, his ratings as a solo host were disappointing, and in a last-ditch change, he was reassigned as co-anchor of the KRLD Morning News in 1999. That led to a collaboration with co-anchor Jack Hines that lasted for another six years and included coverage of pivotal events such as the Oklahoma City bombing, the Fort Worth Tornado, and 9/11.

In 1995, Dean was named co-host of KTVT's Positively Texas! – an afternoon talk and variety show. After initial success, the show began languishing in the ratings, and Dean was approached about possibly switching to news. He began hosting the noon and 5 p.m. news with Rene Syler on CBS 11 – followed by co-hosting duties with Maria Arita on CBS 11 News at 4.

2002-present
By 2005, Ron Chapman was at KLUV and seeking a successor. He turned to Dean, who became KLUV Morning Show host upon Chapman's retirement that year. For a period of time, Jody Dean and the Morning Team was also televised each weekday morning from 7 until 9 on KTXA-TV. Until January 2013, the KLUV Morning Show was co-hosted by news reporter Kathy Jones, traffic reporter Jonathan Hayes, Rebekah Black, and producer Bernie "Mac" Moreland.

Dean was the original deejay, emcee, and rodeo announcer at Billy Bob's Texas, and most recently served as the main public address announcer for Dallas Cowboys home games at Cowboys Stadium. He has also served as public address announcer for the Cotton Bowl since 2009. His final football game at what is now AT&T Stadium was Super Bowl XLV, allowing his voice to be heard before an international audience during the pregame ceremonies.

In 2011, Dean appeared as a peripheral cast member on a cable reality show entitled Most Eligible Dallas.

As of late September 2018, Jody Dean was removed from KLUV's morning show, with Jeff Miles being announced as his replacement. Rebekah Black remains as co-host alongside Miles. Dean's last show with KLUV was September 28, 2018.

Personal life 
Dean's personal life has been tumultuous. Married four times, he has three children – two of whom are grown. An adoptee, Dean reunited with his birth-family in 2002 and maintains a close relationship with them. Raised in the Church of Christ, Dean is a published author (Finding God in the Evening News) and a frequent motivational and inspirational speaker. A professed Christian, Dean experienced a spiritual reawakening in 2002, but openly continues to wrestle with personal choices, as chronicled in a 2003 article authored by Elise Pierce for D Magazine.

Books
Jody Dean, (2004), Finding God in the Evening News: A Broadcast Journalist Looks Beyond The Headlines, Renell,

References

External links
 Jody Dean's review of The Passion of the Christ

1959 births
People from Fort Worth, Texas
American television journalists
American non-fiction writers
American adoptees
Radio personalities from Dallas
People from Abilene, Texas
Abilene Christian University alumni
Living people